The Irbit State Museum of Fine Art contains some important works including etchings by famous European artists. At the moment the museum is the only one in Russia specializing in engravings. In its collection there are engravings by Italian, Dutch, Flemish, German, French, English, Spanish, Swiss, Austrian, Polish, Bulgarian, Belgian, and North American artists. The collection includes works from Albrecht Dürer to Francisco Goya. In 2012 the museum unveiled a major oil work by Peter Paul Rubens to add to its collection of his etchings. Russian art is represented by the works of A. F. Zubova, I. A. Sokolova, E. P. Chemesova, Mikhail Dobuzhinsky, Alexander Deyneka, and many others. The domestic collection represents the artists of Yekaterinburg and Nizhny Tagil.

External links
 Yekaterinburg Museum of Fine Arts
 Irbit Postcards with views of the town (in Russian)
  A series of photographs of the unveiling of the Rubens, the painting and his etchings.

Art museums and galleries in Russia
Modern art museums
Museums in Sverdlovsk Oblast